Telexeca is a rural village in the municipality of Atengo, which is itself in the region of Sierra de Amula. Additionally, the region is it itself in the Mexican state of Jalisco. The location's medium height over sea level is 1,540 meters. Currently, there are probably about three inhabitants in Telexeca. All three inhabitants are apparently neither: adults, illiterate, of indigenous descent, nor speak an indigenous language.

Climate

External links
http://www.mx.mexico-facts.com/Jalisco/Atengo/Up-to-10/Telexeca/
http://mexico.pueblosamerica.com/i/telexeca/
http://www.nuestro-mexico.com/Jalisco/Atengo/Areas-de-menos-de-10-habitantes/Telexeca/
http://www.telepaisa.com/pueblos.php?action=poblacion_ver&poblacion_id=11671
http://www.foro-mexico.com/jalisco/telexeca/mensaje-191505.html

References

Populated places in Jalisco